Ukusoma is the Zulu term for monoamorous simulated intercourse (outercourse). It is a common practise amongst the Zulu for preparation for future adulthood sexual practises.

External links
Zulu - Growing up sexually

Zulu culture
Zulu words and phrases